This is a comprehensive list of Looney Tunes and Merrie Melodies shorts that were given Blue Ribbon reissues by Warner Bros. between 1943 and 1969.

Background 

The Blue Ribbon program was initiated in late 1943 as a way to cut costs for producing cartoons during World War II, and later as a way to compete against the growing popularity of television. Through the reissue seasons, the reissues had a given season's opening rings and the "Merrily We Roll Along" theme (1941–45 rendition or 1945–55 rendition; this depends on the original audio and when it is played) followed by a title card which showed a blue ribbon (hence the program's title) and a Grand Shorts Award trophy. The closing title cards, for the most part, were replaced too, with some exceptions.

The Blue Ribbon titles were edited into the cartoon's original negative. For the first 13 years of the program (1943–1956 re-releases), the credits were also scrapped. However, later re-releases (from 1956 to 1964) kept them. The gap between the keeping and splitting of the credits would determine which cartoons whose copyrights were sold to Associated Artists Productions in 1956, with some exceptions (see below). Only Merrie Melodies and Looney Tunes cartoons made in color were eligible for this program.

A Feud There Was was the first cartoon to be re-released with Blue Ribbon titles on September 11, 1943, scrapping the original titles. It was later re-released again on September 13, 1952, scrapping the first re-release's Blue Ribbon titles.

Though some have had their original bullet title sequences and credits restored for official DVD and Blu-ray releases, majority of the re-releases still have the Blue Ribbon credits. In addition, most Blue Ribbon prints of the short, usually through the American and European 1995 Turner prints, can be seen on television packages throughout the world. Some of them, like A Wild Hare, have edited lines, although the original unedited version is present on The Golden Age of Looney Tunes, Volume 4, Side 1, the Warner Bros. Home Entertainment Academy Awards Animation Collection, The Essential Bugs Bunny, and the Looney Tunes Platinum Collection: Volume 2, Disc 1. Also, several Blue Ribbon prints have altered titles. For example, A Wild Hare is titled The Wild Hare, My Little Buckaroo is titled My Little Buckeroo, and The Fella with the Fiddle is titled The Fella with a Fiddle. In addition to A Feud There Was, instead of re-releasing other shorts into the Blue Ribbon program, seven other Blue Ribbon shorts have been re-released twice, scrapping the first re-release titles. They are, The Cat Came Back (1944 and 1954), Of Fox and Hounds, (1944 and 1954), The Fighting 69½th (1943 and 1953), The Early Worm Gets the Bird (1943 and 1952), Rhapsody in Rivets (1947 and 1954), The Trial of Mr. Wolf (1946 and 1954), and Old Glory (1945 and 1953). However, the latter three were credited Warner Bros. on their first re-release, keeping the first Blue Ribbon re-release closing titles for the second re-release. Starting with the 1947–48 animation season reissues, custom fonts for titles were used. Dangerous Dan McFoo was the first cartoon to use this.

After the sale of copyrights of the pre-August 1948 cartoons to Associated Artists Productions in 1956, Warner Bros. would start to keep the original credits on Blue Ribbon reissues, in an attempt to save more money. These re-releases replaced the original opening cards with the animation season the cartoon was re-released in, then proceeded to the original credits through a cut instead of a fade in (they were edited into the original negative). These releases between 1956 and 1964 kept the original opening and ending music, regardless of what series the cartoon was originally in. In addition, re-releases between 1956 and 1959 always kept the original closing title cards, regardless what series the cartoon was originally in. But starting with the 1959–64 season, for the most part, the original closing title card was replaced with the reissue season's ending title card.

For the Looney Tunes Golden Collection DVD releases, Warner Bros. went through great lengths to track down whatever elements of the original title credits still exist in an effort to re-create as best they could the original versions of the altered 'blue ribbon' shorts. Some pristine prints of the original issues were obtained from the UCLA Film and Television Archive. As a result, such cartoons as I Love to Singa and Book Revue can once again be seen as they were originally intended. Unfortunately, there are some "Blue Ribbon" reissue versions of cartoons that are represented on the Golden Collection DVDs as they are the only versions that were made available for exhibition. In any event, to this day there is controversy among animation fans and historians on the alteration of the "Blue Ribbon" releases, primarily the ones re-released between 1943 and 1956.

Exceptions 
The 1940 cartoon Mighty Hunters was the one exception to the original rule. The 1952–53 opening rings and "Blue Ribbon" title card were shown as normal, but then proceeded to the original technical credits. This was the only cartoon which ended up in the a.a.p. package (released prior to August 1, 1948) to be reissued under the 1956–57 (and later) rules.

On the other hand, five cartoons which Warner Bros. would keep for their own television packages, because these shorts were released after July 31, 1948, were re-released under the original 1943 rules (the technical credits are removed). These were: You Were Never Duckier, The Foghorn Leghorn, Daffy Dilly, Kit for Cat, and Scaredy Cat. You Were Never Duckier was reissued in the 1954–55 season, while the others were reissued during the 1955–56 season. Daffy Dilly was originally produced in Cinecolor, while the rest were produced in Technicolor. Also, Daffy Dilly is the only one of the five to have its original titles not present on DVD releases, although they are known to exist. The Foghorn Leghorn is the only one of the five to be directed by Robert McKimson and Kit for Cat is the only one of the five to be directed by Friz Freleng. The other three were directed by Chuck Jones.

Notably, Bugs Bunny cartoons were often excluded from being reissued. This was due to those cartoons being billed as Bugs Bunny Specials, a sub-series which Warner Bros. sold to theaters at a higher price. They also allowed theaters to book these cartoons separately if they wanted. Very few cartoons featuring the character were actually reissued under the program: Only 22 cartoons in total were reissued, and only A Wild Hare and Hiawatha's Rabbit Hunt were reissued under the 1943–1956 rules (i.e. tiles & credits removed). The other 20 still keep their both their technical credits and (with the exceptions of Hot Cross Bunny,  Knights Must Fall,  Rabbit Hood & Homeless Hare) the Bugs Bunny in card as well.

Cartoons with re-releases in the last few years of the program (after 1964) did not have new titles. Instead, they were re-released with their original titles.

Reissued cartoons

Cartoons with original technical credits restored on DVD
Many of the above cartoons have been restored for DVD release as part of the Looney Tunes Golden Collection, Looney Tunes Platinum Collection,  Looney Tunes Super Stars and Warner Bros. Home Entertainment Academy Awards Animation Collection DVD releases. However, only a handful of cartoons that were reissued prior to the 1956–57 season have their original opening titles, technical credits, and closing titles restored.

(*) Upon re-release, short retained original ending card.
(**) "A Wild Hare" had its original credits present for The Golden Age of Looney Tunes Volume 4, though the opening titles on that release were just recreations.
(***) Original opening titles and credits restored for their 1998 "THIS VERSION" prints.
(#) Original opening titles and credits present for their 1995 Turner "dubbed" version prints.

In addition to the cartoons listed above, the following cartoons reissued after 1956-57 have had their original opening rings, and ending rings if re-released in the 1959-64 animation season, restored.

(*) Upon re-release, short retained original ending card.

"A Wild Hare", reissued as "The Wild Hare", had its original credits present for The Golden Age of Looney Tunes Volume 4, though the opening titles were just recreations. The original opening titles were restored for the Warner Bros. Home Entertainment Academy Awards Animation Collection.

A copy of "Bone Sweet Bone" with the original titles exists. However, the original copy with the original titles has problems of its own, as split cuts in this copy cut out the ending lines from when the dog says, "If you think for a moment that this little incident is going to upset me--" then it cuts to him freaking out. The rest of his line, "you're absolutely right", is missing in the original title print. The Blue Ribbon print does not have these split-cuts. In 2020, the Blue Ribbon titles were restored for HBO Max. 

The original titles for "The Merry Old Soul", "September in the Rain", "Tweetie Pie",  "Tale of Two Mice", "House Hunting Mice", "Doggone Cats", "I Taw a Putty Tat", "Daffy Dilly", "Mouse Menace" and "Life with Feathers" all are known to exist. However, Warner Bros. does not restore 8mm or 16mm prints, and many of these shorts only have their original titles in 8mm or 16mm versions. Hence, the Blue Ribbon titles for many of these were restored instead.

The titles for "A Day at the Zoo", "Of Fox and Hounds", "The Isle of Pingo Pongo", "Don't Look Now", "Wacky Wildlife", "Johnny Smith and Poker-Huntas", "Thugs with Dirty Mugs", "A Feud There Was", "The Early Worm Gets the Bird", "Circus Today", "The Mice Will Play", and "I Only Have Eyes for You" were found on eBay in 2007, but never released on DVD.

Sketches and photos of the original titles for "Katnip Kollege", "Sioux Me", "The Fifth-Column Mouse", "Pigs in a Polka", "The Mouse-Merized Cat", "The Cagey Canary", "A Tale of Two Kitties" and "Horton Hatches the Egg" have surfaced, but their real titles have not been found.

The titles pre-1948 for "When I Yoo Hoo", "Fresh Fish" and "The Rattled Rooster" were restored for HBO Max, but have not been released on DVD. The titles for "The Lady in Red" are official recreations from Warner Bros., although it has its original audio music on the recreation title card, as well as the ending titles, while the restoration for "When I Yoo Hoo" retains the Blue Ribbon ending titles. MeTV aired a restored version of "Cross Country Detours" with the original titles before it was released to DVD or HBO Max. The original titles of "Farm Frolics" were found in a discovering through the Library of Congress. 

The titles post-1948 for "Two's a Crowd", "Leghorn Swoggled" and "Sleepy Time Possum" were restored for HBO Max, but have not been released on DVD.

Further reading 
 Looney Tunes and Merrie Melodies: A Complete Illustrated Guide to the Warner Bros. Cartoons, by Jerry Beck and Will Friedwald (1989), Henry Holt, 
 Chuck Amuck : The Life and Times of an Animated Cartoonist by Chuck Jones, published by Farrar Straus & Giroux, 
 That's Not All, Folks! by Mel Blanc, Philip Bashe. Warner Books,  (Softcover)  (Hardcover)
 Of Mice and Magic: A History of American Animated Cartoons, Leonard Maltin, Revised Edition 1987, Plume  (Softcover)  (Hardcover)

See also 
 Looney Tunes
 Merrie Melodies
 Censored Eleven
 Looney Tunes Golden Collection

References

Citations

Sources 

 Warner Bros. Animation Production Numbers, 1946 to Present (A Partial List)
 Field Guide to Titles and Credits

External links 
 The Big Cartoon DataBase entry for Merrie Melodies Cartoons and for Looney Tunes Cartoons
 The Ultimate Looney Tunes and Merrie Melodies Website by Jon Cooke
 "Warner Brothers Cartoon Companion", a wealth of trivia about the Warner cartoons
 Official site

Lists of Looney Tunes cartoons